This is the results breakdown of the local elections held in Extremadura on 26 May 1991. The following tables show detailed results in the autonomous community's most populous municipalities, sorted alphabetically.

City control
The following table lists party control in the most populous municipalities, including provincial capitals (shown in bold). Gains for a party are displayed with the cell's background shaded in that party's colour.

Municipalities

Almendralejo
Population: 25,485

Badajoz
Population: 126,781

Cáceres
Population: 73,915

Mérida
Population: 53,732

Plasencia
Population: 34,488

See also
1991 Extremaduran regional election

References

Extremadura
1991